ZMD: Zombies of Mass Destruction is a 2010 zombie comedy film directed by Kevin Hamedani and starring Janette Armand, Doug Fahl, and Cooper Hopkins.

Plot

The film begins on a beach in the peninsula town of Port Gamble. A blind resident discovers a rotting zombie washed up in the sand, who wakes up.

On September 25, 2003, Iranian-American girl Frida Abbas has returned to Port Gamble, her home town after dropping out of Princeton University. She runs into her neighbor, Joe Miller, at a gas station with his wife, Judy, and their teenage son, Brian.

Meanwhile, couple Tom Hunt and Lance Murphy arrive in Port Gamble to tell Tom's mother that he is gay. While Tom and Lance explore the town, many island residents appear to have been zombified, including a police officer.

Frida arrives at her house and finds her dad, Ali, praying. Frida sneaks out of the house with her boyfriend, Derek.

Tom and Lance are having dinner with Tom's mom, who reveals that she was bitten earlier by a bystander at the store. She goes into the kitchen to prepare dessert and Tom admits that he is gay, while his mom becomes a zombie and tries to attack Lance. The TV news claims, without any real evidence, that Port Gamble is experiencing a bio-terrorism attack which turns its victims into zombies.

While Frida and Derek are outside, Derek's face is horrifically ripped off and eaten by a zombie. Ali leaves the house to look for his daughter, while Frida escapes from a group of zombies to her abandoned and surrounded house, where she runs into Judy, Brian and Joe. Frida and Judy hide in the basement with Brian and Joe; Judy is bitten by a zombie while helping Frida inside. Joe sees that a terrorist claiming responsibility for the outbreak is wearing the same necklace as Frida. He ties Frida to a chair and asks her questions about U.S. history.

Tom and Lance find Mrs. Banks. They run into the local church where Reverend Haggis, Mayor Burton, Larry, a married couple, a local senior woman, and another churchgoer are playing bingo. They begin to board the windows.

Back in the basement, Joe nails Frida's foot to the ground and begins to move a flame from a blow torch towards her face when Brian smashes a hole in his father's head with a hammer. Brian is able to lift the nail out of Frida's foot just before he is attacked and eaten by the zombified Judy. The wounded Joe watches in disbelief as his wife devours Brian.
 
As Mayor Burton starts to show obvious signs of infection, Mrs. Banks suggests quarantining him in a room, which causes Mayor Burton to rebel against her. Tom and Lance lecture Mayor Burton, which makes Reverend Haggis decide to turn Lance and Tom into straights by drugging them and making them watch gay "erotic" films. Larry and the married couple go downstairs to assist Haggis in the process, locking themselves in the basement. Mayor Burton reanimates into a zombie and bites the senior woman's jaw off, leaving Mrs. Banks alone with the zombie. As Lance is being drugged, Tom threatens the group with Larry's gun and forces them to let Mrs. Banks in. Mayor Burton enters with her. Larry and the couple quickly run out of the church with Tom, Lance, and Mrs. Banks following, while Reverend Haggis attempts to talk to Burton but is beaten half to death using his own torn-off arm.

Frida makes it home to her father, who turns into a zombie, and she is forced to kill him. She prepares to commit suicide with her father's shotgun but hears a helicopter. She runs out of the house into a playground full of zombies and the still-living Joe Miller. In a struggle, Joe tries to handcuff Frida to a slide, but Frida breaks loose from his grip, handcuffs him to the slide, and runs off. Joe cries that he's sorry and that he was stupid. Frida says that she forgives him but refuses to release him. The zombies devour Joe. Frida soon finds Tom, Lance, and Mrs. Banks, and saves them from a zombie. They leave to find the helicopter where U.S. soldiers rescue them and take them to refuge.

Six months later, Port Gamble is out of quarantine and begins to repopulate. Mrs. Banks is now mayor of the town, and Frida runs her deceased dad's diner. Tom and Lance visit her and propose that she stay with them in New York City. She declines but promises that she will see them soon. Tom and Lance leave the island while Larry and the married couple enjoy a meal at Frida's diner.

Cast

Production 
ZMD: Zombies of Mass Destruction premiered at Film Fest DC and has screened at the Seattle International Film Festival, the Minneapolis-St. Paul International Film Festival, the Los Angeles Film Festival, and Philadelphia's QFest. The film runs at 8 Films To Die For, also known as the After Dark Horrorfest. It premiered on January 29 at NYC Zombie Village Crawl. The DVD was released on March 23, 2010, in the United States, and included information on the making of the film.

ZMD: Zombies of Mass Destruction is not related to the comic series of the same name by comic book writer Kevin Grevioux.

References

External links
 

2010 comedy horror films
Films set in the 2000s
American comedy horror films
American LGBT-related films
American zombie comedy films
2010s English-language films
Gay-related films
LGBT-related comedy horror films
2010 films
2010 LGBT-related films
2010s American films